Liang Jiahong (born 6 March 1988 in Longjiang, Shunde, Foshan, Guangdong) is a Chinese sprinter who specializes in the 100 metres.

He finished fifth at the 2006 World Junior Championships. At the 2007 Asian Championships he won a bronze medal in the relay. He was an unused reserve runner in the 4 x 100 metres relay event at the 2008 Summer Olympics. However, he won the relay gold medal at the 11th Chinese National Games in 2009. He won the relay silver medal with China at the 2009 Asian Athletics Championships later that year.  He was one of the 2012 Olympic Chinese men's 4 × 100 m team.

His personal best time is 10.31 seconds, achieved in May 2010 in Zhaoqing. In the 200 metres he has a 20.83 seconds personal best, achieved in April 2008 in Hangzhou.

References

External links
Team China 2008

1988 births
Living people
Chinese male sprinters
People from Foshan
Asian Games medalists in athletics (track and field)
Athletes (track and field) at the 2012 Summer Olympics
Olympic athletes of China
Runners from Guangdong
Athletes (track and field) at the 2010 Asian Games
Asian Games gold medalists for China
Medalists at the 2010 Asian Games